Sau Ling 'Angela' Chau (date of birth unknown - 2020) was a Hong Kong international lawn bowler.

Bowls career
She won a bronze medal in the fours at the 1990 Commonwealth Games in Auckland with Naty Rozario, Jenny Wallis and Yee Lai Lee. In addition she competed at the 1994 Commonwealth Games.

She has won twenty national titles (two in the singles, four in the pairs, five in the triples and nine in the fours). In addition she won six medals at the Asia Pacific Bowls Championships.

Chau died on 31 October 2020.

References

Hong Kong female bowls players
2020 deaths
Date of birth missing
Commonwealth Games medallists in lawn bowls
Commonwealth Games bronze medallists for Hong Kong
Bowls players at the 1990 Commonwealth Games
Medallists at the 1990 Commonwealth Games